The G&S 30 is an American sailboat that was designed by Graham & Schlageter as an International Offshore Rule  Half Ton class racer and first built in 1979.

Production
The design was built by a number of builders on a custom basis, including at least three built by Shea Marine.

Design
The G&S 30 is a recreational keelboat, built predominantly of fiberglass and wood. It has a fractional sloop rig, a raked stem, a sharply reverse transom, an internally mounted spade-type/transom-hung rudder controlled by a tiller and a fixed fin keel. It displaces  and has lead ballast.

The boat may be fitted with an inboard engine or a small outboard motor for docking and maneuvering.

Operational history
The boat is supported by an active class club that organizes racing events, the Half Ton Class.

See also
List of sailing boat types

References

External links
Photo of a G&S 30

Keelboats
1970s sailboat type designs
Sailing yachts
Sailboat type designs by Graham & Schlageter
Sailboat types built by Shea Marine